Kiril Popov (Bulgarian: Кирил Попов; born 15 March 1985) is a Bulgarian table tennis player and coach. He is currently one of the highest ranked Bulgarians in table tennis and competes in the top table tennis division of the country. Popov is also a member of the Bulgarian  national table tennis team.

Biography
Popov's first coach was his father Nikola Popov and he began his career with "Vitamina 92" in Stamboliyski (where legendary Bulgarian players such as Mariano Lukov and Kostadin Lengerov had honed their skills). In 2006 Popov won the title at the U21 Balkaniad in Serbia. He has represented "Korabostroitel-92" from Varna, "Digesta" (Sofia) and also plied his trade in Turkey and Germany. At the 2015 Asarel Bulgaria Open Popov reached the 1/4 finals.

References

Living people
1985 births
Bulgarian male table tennis players
People from Plovdiv Province